Emma is an unincorporated community and census-designated place (CDP) in Buncombe County, North Carolina, United States. It was first listed as a CDP in the 2020 census with a population of 2,174.

The community is in central Buncombe County, bordered to the east and south by the city of Asheville, the county seat.

Demographics

2020 census

Note: the US Census treats Hispanic/Latino as an ethnic category. This table excludes Latinos from the racial categories and assigns them to a separate category. Hispanics/Latinos can be of any race.

References 

Census-designated places in Buncombe County, North Carolina
Census-designated places in North Carolina